Eiji Kidoguchi is a Japanese politician who was a member of the House of Councillors of Japan, having been elected in 2016.

References 

Living people
Members of the House of Councillors (Japan)
Year of birth missing (living people)